Reid Memorial Presbyterian Church is an architecturally significant building located at 11th and North "A" Streets in Richmond, Indiana.  Designed by the Cleveland, Ohio architectural partnership of Sidney Badgley and William H. Nicklas the building was begun in 1904 and dedicated on May 13, 1906.  The building committee had visited the Badgley and Nicklas-designed St. Paul's Methodist Episcopal Church (now St. Paul's Memorial United Methodist Church) which had been built by the Clement Studebaker family in South Bend, Indiana and the two churches have strikingly similar design elements in the sanctuaries.  Reid Church was paid for by Daniel G. Reid in memory of his parents Daniel Reid and Anna Gray Reid.  The church interiors and windows were designed by Louis Comfort Tiffany and the Tiffany Studios.  The original organ designed by Hook and Hastings is still in use, though it was rebuilt in 1958 by the Wicks Organ Company.  The organ was featured with a recital during the Organ Historical Society's 2007 convention in Indianapolis.

During the 1920s the Ku Klux Klan was a powerful political and social force in Indiana. In 1922 the Klan was introduced to Richmond by Robert Lyons, who began by recruiting at Reid Church, where his father, Samuel Ross Lyons (1849 – 1915), had been pastor years earlier. Robert Lyons was eventually appointed national chief of staff for the Klan.

Membership having dwindled to a few dozen people, the congregation was dissolved November 5, 2017, and the church closed.
The building has been listed on the "Ten Most Endangered List" of Indiana Landmarks since 2019.

Notes

Sources 
 Tomlan, Mary Raddant and Michael A. Richmond, Indiana: Its Physical and Aesthetic Heritage to 1920, Indianapolis: Indiana Historical Society, 2003

External links 
 YouTube video of the church's Tiffany windows

 Reid Memorial Presybyterian Church website
 Tiffany Windows at Reid Memorial

Historic American Buildings Survey in Indiana
Churches on the National Register of Historic Places in Indiana
National Register of Historic Places in Wayne County, Indiana
Presbyterian churches in Indiana
Gothic Revival church buildings in Indiana
Churches completed in 1906
20th-century Presbyterian church buildings in the United States
Buildings and structures in Richmond, Indiana
Historic district contributing properties in Indiana
Churches in Wayne County, Indiana
1906 establishments in Indiana